The Tieralplistock (3,383 m) is a mountain of the Urner Alps, located on the border between the Swiss cantons of Bern and Valais. It lies between the Trift Glacier and the Rhone Glacier, just east of the lake of Gelmer.

Between the Diechterhorn and the Tieralplistock is a slightly higher unnamed summit (3,388 m).

References

External links
 Tieralplistock on Hikr

Mountains of the Alps
Alpine three-thousanders
Mountains of Switzerland
Mountains of the canton of Bern
Mountains of Valais
Bern–Valais border